Yeongju Station is a railway station on the Jungang Line, the Yeongdong Line and the Gyeongbuk Line in South Korea.

External links
 Cyber station information from Korail

Railway stations in North Gyeongsang Province
Yeongju
Railway stations opened in 1941